Dask or Desk may refer to:
 Dask, Hormozgan
 Desk, Anbarabad, Kerman Province
 Desk, Bam, Kerman Province
 Desk-e Bala, Kerman Province

See also
 DASK, the first computer in Denmark.
 Dask (software), a library for performing parallel computation in Python